USS PC-542 was a  built for the United States Navy during World War II. She was transferred to the French Navy under Lend-Lease in September 1944 and renamed Tirailleur.

Career
PC-542 was laid down at the Defoe Shipbuilding Company in Bay City, Michigan, on 26 February 1942; launched on 4 April 1942; and commissioned on 25 May 1942.

After commissioning, PC-542 ran convoys to Guantánamo Bay, Cuba, before sailing for the Mediterranean, arriving in Arzew, Algeria. She participated in the invasions of Scoglitti, Brolo, Salerno, and Anzio in Italy; and in Operation Dragoon—the invasion of Southern France.

On 30 September 1944, PC-542 was transferred to France under Lend-Lease, where she served as Tirailleur and was credited with shooting down two German aircraft in the Mediterranean.

She was condemned by the French Navy in 1957.

See also

List of Escorteurs of the French Navy

References 

 

PC-461-class submarine chasers
Ships built in Bay City, Michigan
1942 ships
World War II patrol vessels of the United States
PC-461-class submarine chasers of the French Navy
World War II patrol vessels of France
Cold War patrol vessels of France